Shurinovka is a rural locality (a selo) in Lipchanskoye Rural Settlement, Bogucharsky District, Voronezh Oblast, Russia. The population was 383 as of 2010. There are 3 streets.

Geography 
Shurinovka is located on the Levaya Bogucharka River, 31 km southwest of Boguchar (the district's administrative centre) by road. Varvarovka is the nearest rural locality.

References 

Rural localities in Bogucharsky District